This article discusses the fictional timeline of the Star Trek franchise. The franchise is primarily set in the future, ranging from the mid-22nd century (Star Trek: Enterprise) to the early 25th century (Star Trek: Picard). However the franchise has also outlined a fictional future history of Earth prior to this, and, primarily through time travel plots, explored both past and further-future settings, including the third season onwards of Star Trek: Discovery being set in the 32nd century.

The chronology is complicated by the presence of divergent timelines within the franchise's narrative, as well as internal contradictions and retcons. The original series generally avoided assigning real-world dates to its futuristic setting, instead using the stardate system. Series from Star Trek: The Next Generation onwards defined their temporal settings in conventional form.

Series, books, and film settings
This table shows each TV series and movie, its year of release or broadcast, the year it was set in according to the prevailing Okuda chronology (see below), and the stardate range for that year. The designation Enterprise-based series are the series that featured the various incarnations of the starship USS Enterprise. In universe timeline chronological order Star Trek: Enterprise (ENT), Star Trek: The Original Series (TOS), Star Trek: The Animated Series (TAS), Star Trek: The Next Generation (TNG), and all 13 of the Star Trek feature films, including the three newest J. J. Abrams "reboot" films, or "Kelvin Timeline" based on the original series.

Timeline in order of series air dates

Chronology and events
This timeline is based on the Star Trek Chronology model described below, supplemented by data from the website startrek.com. The Timeline also consists of before, between, and after those events.

Note: Many of these dates are rounded-off approximations, as the dialog from which they are derived often includes qualifiers such as "over," "more than," or "less than."

Before Common Era
The Big Bang
Quinn hides in the big bang to avoid discovery by Q.
c. 6 billion years ago
The Guardian of Forever is formed.
c. 4 billion years ago
A humanoid civilization seeds the oceans of many planets with genetic material, which would lead to the development of humanoids on many planets.
c. 65 to 100 million years ago
The dinosaurs (the Voth civilization) from the episode "Distant Origin" are most likely descendants of Hadrosaurids who lived in the Cretaceous period of Earth's history.
c. 1 million years ago
Sargon's people explore the galaxy and colonize various planets, possibly including Vulcan.
c. 600,000 years ago
The Tkon Empire, an interstellar state consisting of dozens of star systems in the Alpha Quadrant, becomes extinct.
c. 200,000 years ago
The Iconian civilization is destroyed.
c. 8,000 BCE
The Dominion may have been founded in the Gamma Quadrant by the shapeshifting race known as the Changelings around this time, possibly in a different form than is known in the modern timeline.
c. 2700 BCE
A group of extraterrestrial beings land on Earth and are eventually known as the Greek gods, as established in the episode "Who Mourns for Adonais?".

1st millennium of the Common Era
c. 4th century CE
The Vulcan Time of Awakening. In the midst of horrific wars on Vulcan, the philosopher Surak leads his people, teaching them to embrace logic and suppress all emotion.
The Dominion may have been founded in the Gamma Quadrant by the shapeshifting race known as the Changelings (founders) around this time.
c. 9th century
Kahless the Unforgettable unites the Klingons by defeating the tyrant Molor in battle, and provides his people with teachings based on a philosophy of honor.

Pre-20th century
c. 1505
The Borg are known to exist in the Delta Quadrant, 900 years prior to Voyager landing on the planet as referenced by the Vaadwaur "Dragon's Teeth" (VOY).
c. 1570
The ancient Bajorans use solar sail ships to explore their star system, and one may have reached Cardassia.
18th century
The Suliban homeworld becomes uninhabitable ("Detained" (ENT)).
The Preservers transport various Native Americans to a faraway planet.
c. 1864
The Skagarans abduct humans for use as slaves in their colony world (as referred to in Enterprise Season 3: "North Star").
c. 1871
The Cardassian Union is established.
   1888
  August 31: Jack the Ripper's first victim is found murdered and mutilated in East London (as referred to in Star Trek:  The Original Series Season 2:  "Wolf in the Fold").
c. 1893
 "Time's Arrow" (TNG).

20th century
 1918
World War I ends with 6 million dead ("Bread and Circuses (TOS)").
 1930
 "The City on the Edge of Forever" (TOS).
 1937
 Several hundred humans are secretly abducted by an alien race known as the Briori and brought to the Delta Quadrant. Eight are cryogenically frozen, including long-lost pilot Amelia Earhart ("The 37's" (VOY)).
 1944
 "Storm Front" (ENT).
 1945
 World War II ends with 11 million dead ("Bread and Circuses (TOS)").
The United Nations is established in San Francisco but its headquarters moves to New York City.
 1947
 Three Ferengi (Quark, Rom, and Nog) crash land in the New Mexico desert, and are held by the U.S. government at a secret base for scientific study ("Little Green Men" (DS9)).
 1957
A Vulcan scout ship visits Earth, according to a story told by T'Pol (presumably a true story as T'Pol examines a purse which was portrayed as used by her great-great-grandmother during the story; see episode entry) ("Carbon Creek" (ENT)).
 1967
Captain Braxton's 29th century Federation timeship Aeon crashlands on Earth ("Future's End" (Voyager)).
 1968
 "Assignment: Earth" (TOS) past events.
 1969
 "Tomorrow Is Yesterday" (TOS) past events.
 1986 
 Star Trek IV: The Voyage Home past events.
 1992
 The Eugenics Wars (WWIII) begin. (WWIII is retconned to be in the 2050s by TNGs Encounter at Farpoint and Star Trek First Contact and to being a conflict separate from the Eugenics Wars; DS9s "Doctor Bashir, I Presume?" retcons the Eugenics Wars as being in the 22nd century. SNWs "Strange New World" retcons it again to taking place in the 21st century, prior to WWIII.)
 1996
 The Eugenics Wars end. (WWIII is retconned to be in the 2050s by TNGs "Encounter at Farpoint" and Star Trek First Contact; DS9s "Doctor Bashir, I Presume?" retcons the Eugenics Wars as being in the 22nd century. SNWs "Strange New World" retcons it again to taking place in the 21st century prior to WWIII.)
 "Future's End" (VOY).
 1999
 Voyager 6 is launched.
 2000
 The past events of "11:59" (VOY).

21st century
 2002
 The interstellar probe Nomad is launched.
 2004
 The past events of "Carpenter Street" (ENT).
 2009
 The first successful Earth-Saturn probe takes place.
 2012
 The world's first self-sustaining civic environment, Millennium Gate, which became the model for the first habitat on Mars, completed in Portage Creek, Indiana ("11:59" (VOY)).
 2018
 Sleeper ships are made obsolete.
 2024
 A united Ireland is achieved (TNG "The High Ground").
 The past events of "Past Tense" (DS9), namely the "Bell Riots".
 The past events of Star Trek: Picard Season 2.
 2026
World War III begins on Earth. Colonel Green and a group of eco-terrorists commit genocide that claimed the lives of thirty-seven million people. (ENT "In A Mirror Darkly, Part Two") (In TOS, WWIII took place in the 1990s and is established as an alternate name for the Eugenics Wars while DS9's "Doctor Bashir, I Presume?" had the Eugenics Wars in the 22nd century. SNW's "Strange New World" retcons the Eugenics Wars to the 21st century, but prior to the outbreak of WWIII.)
 2032
 Ares IV, a crewed mission to Mars is launched.
 Zefram Cochrane is born.
 2037
 The spaceship Charybdis makes an attempt to leave the solar system.
2047
 The Hermosa quake strikes the region of southern California surrounding Los Angeles. The land sinks under two hundred meters of water. In the ensuing centuries, the region recovers, having transformed into one of the world's largest coral reefs. These reefs become home to thousands of different marine species.
2053
 World War III ends and Earth is left devastated, mostly because of nuclear warfare. Most of the major cities are left in ruins with few remaining governments and the death total reaching 600 million. Scientific advancement continues, however. (In TOS, WWIII took place in the 1990s and is established as an alternate name for the Eugenics Wars while DS9's "Doctor Bashir, I Presume?" had the Eugenics Wars in the 22nd century. SNW's "Strange New World" retcons the Eugenics Wars to the 21st century, but prior to the outbreak of WWIII.)
 2062
 Oldtown San Francisco is struck by an enormous earthquake, the Greater Quake, and it takes 20 years for the city to be restored.
 2063
 The past events of Star Trek: First Contact. Zefram Cochrane makes the first human warp flight with the Phoenix as civilization rebuilds following WWIII. This attracts the Vulcans and they make first contact with humans. (TOS "Metamorphosis" stated that Zefram Cochrane disappeared 150 years ago at the age of 87, which fits with the current timeline.)
 c. 2065
 The SS Valiant is launched.
 2067
 The uncrewed interstellar warp probe Friendship 1 is launched.
 2069
 The colony ship SS Conestoga is launched. It would found the Terra Nova colony.
 2079
 Earth begins to recover from its nuclear war. The recovery is aided and partially organized by a newly established political entity called the European Hegemony.
 2088
 T'Pol is born.

22nd century
 2103
 Earth colonizes Mars.
 2112
 Jonathan Archer is born in upstate New York on Earth.
2119
Zefram Cochrane, who now is residing on Alpha Centauri, sets off for parts unknown and disappears. Some had thought he was testing a new engine. After an exhaustive search, it is believed that Cochrane has died. He becomes one of the most famous missing people in history.
 2129
 Hoshi Sato is born.
 2130
 The United Nations preposes a new fleet must be installed to explore the wonders beyond space and creation itself and Starfleet Command is born with San Francisco as its headquarters.
 2142
 Warp 2 Barrier broken by Commander Robinson in NX Alpha and Warp 2.5 achieved by Commander Archer in NX Beta.
 2145
 Warp 3 Broken by Commander Duvall in NX Delta.
 2149
 The USS Enterprise (NX-01) is under construction in upstate New York.
 2150
 Keel laid for Enterprise (NX-01).

 2151–2155
 The events of Star Trek: Enterprise take place.
 2155
 The USS Defiant, a Constitution-class vessel from the Prime Universe in 2268, travels back in time and also emerges in the Mirror Universe following its interaction with an anomaly. The abandoned Defiant is found by the Tholians. The Terran Empire learns of the ship's existence and subsequently captures it for their own use.
 2156–2160
 The Earth–Romulan War is fought between United Earth and its allies, and the Romulan Star Empire. The war ends with the Battle of Cheron, which results in Earth inflicting a humiliating defeat to the Romulans, to such a degree that the Empire still considers the battle an embarrassment over 200 years later. The Romulan Neutral Zone is established.
 2161
The United Federation of Planets is founded by Earth, Tellar, Andoria, and Vulcan.
 2165
 Sarek, Federation diplomat and father of Spock, is born on Vulcan.
 2184
 Johnathan Archer is elected as the first United Federation of Planets President.
 2192
 Johnathan Archer steps down as UFP President over 8 years.
 2195 
 Robert April is born.
 2160s to 2196
 The Daedalus class starship is active.

23rd century
 2222
 Montgomery Scott is born in Scotland.
 2226
 Michael Burnham is born on Earth.
 2227
Leonard McCoy is born in Georgia, North America on Earth.
 2230
Spock, the son of Sarek and the human Amanda Grayson, is born on Vulcan.
 2232
 The events of Star Trek: Short Treks episode "The Girl Who Made the Stars" take place.
 2233
 James T. Kirk is born in Riverside, Iowa on Earth.
 2233 (alternate timeline)
 Spock and the Romulan mining ship Narada, commanded by Nero, emerge from a black hole created by Spock's detonation of red matter in 2387 and arrive in the past. Nero's arrival and subsequent attack on the USS Kelvin creates the Kelvin Timeline.
 James T. Kirk is born aboard a shuttlecraft from the USS Kelvin.
 James T. Kirk's father, George Kirk, is killed.
 2238
 The events of Star Trek: Short Treks episode "The Brightest Star" take place.
 2241 (alternate timeline)
 Pavel Chekov born in Russia on Earth
 2245–2250
 The USS Enterprise, a Constitution class vessel is launched under the command of Robert April, on a five-year mission of exploration. In the alternate time line created by Nero's attack on the USS Kelvin, the Enterprise is still under construction in 2255 and is not launched on its maiden voyage until 2258.
 2245
 Pavel Chekov is born to Russian parents. In the alternate timeline created by Nero's attack on the USS Kelvin, Chekov is only eight years younger than James T. Kirk, implying a birthdate of 2241.
 2250
 After a refit, the USS Enterprise (NCC-1701) is launched on a second five-year mission. Command of the ship is assigned to Captain Christopher Pike.
 2254
 The events of Star Trek: Short Treks episode "Q&A" take place.
 The events of "The Cage".
 2256-2257
 The events of Star Trek: Discovery season 1 take place, The Klingon Federation War. 
2257-2258 
The events of Star Trek: Discovery season 2 take place. The USS Discovery and USS Enterprise (NCC-1701) engage in a pitched battle to neutralise the rogue AI Control. The battle is a success, but the Enterprise falsely reports that the Discovery was lost, with all hands to conceal the fact that it traveled 930 years into the future in order to prevent Control from reasserting itself. The Enterprise subsequently undergoes repairs and departs for Edrin II 4 months later.
 2258 (alternate timeline)
 The events of Star Trek take place. Nero destroys the planet Vulcan – killing billions, including Spock's mother – as well as 9 Federation starships. The USS Enterprise (NCC-1701) is built in the state of Iowa and is launched on its maiden voyage under Captain Christopher Pike. James T. Kirk becomes the ship's new captain shortly afterward. Henceforth, a different time line is required.
The events of Star Trek: Bridge Crew take place.
The USS Aegis is searching for a new homeworld for the Vulcans after the destruction of their planet. The ship heads for a region of space called 'The Trench', which is being occupied by Klingons.
The events of Star Trek (2013 video game) take place.
Months Later, Captain Kirk, Spock, and the crew of the USS Enterprise encounter a powerful alien race known as the Gorn.
 2259 (alternate timeline)
 The events of Star Trek Into Darkness take place.
 2259
 The events of Star Trek: Strange New Worlds season 1 take place.
 The Enterprise begins another five-year mission under Christopher Pike.
 2260 (alternate timeline)
 The Enterprise is launched on a historic five-year mission.
 2263 (alternate timeline)
Space Station Yorktown is established by Commodore Paris.
 The events of Star Trek Beyond take place. The USS Enterprise is destroyed – The USS Enterprise-A is commissioned at Starbase Yorktown as its replacement.
 Ambassador Spock dies.
 2261–2264
 The USS Enterprise (NCC-1701) undergoes a major refit, increasing its crew complement from 203 to 430.
 2263
Boothby, groundskeeper and counselor at Starfleet Academy, is born.
 2265–2270
Following the promotion of Christopher Pike, Captain James T. Kirk is assigned command of the Enterprise on a historic five-year mission. (In the originally canonical Star Trek Spaceflight Chronology this was 2207 to 2212; Star Trek: Strange New Worlds contradicts this somewhat by dating Pike's accident to approximately 2268 or 2269 (per dialogue in the episode "Strange New World" stating the accident occurs 10 years in the future), but the TOS episode "The Menagerie" takes place during the first season, approximately a year into Kirk's mission rather than close to its end.)
 2265
 The events of "Where No Man Has Gone Before" (TOS)
 2266–2269
 The events of Star Trek: The Original Series take place.
 2269-2270
 The events of Star Trek: The Animated Series take place. (There is no on-screen confirmation of this, but anecdotally TAS is believed to take place towards the end of the mission.
2270
 The USS Enterprise (NCC-1701) returns from its five-year mission under the command of Captain James T. Kirk and enters major refit while Kirk is promoted to Admiral at Starfleet Command. Capt. Will Decker is assigned command of the vessel.
 2273
 The events of Star Trek: The Motion Picture.
 2273-2278
 The upgraded USS Enterprise (NCC-1701) embarks on a five-year mission under the command of Admiral James T. Kirk.
 2279
 Around this time the USS Enterprise (NCC-1701) is retired from active duty and assigned as a training vessel in orbit of Earth. At some point during this period, Spock is promoted to captain and assigned command of the vessel.
 2284
 The USS Excelsior (NX-2000) is built in San Francisco fleet yard and was later docked on the space station and was the first ship with trans warp drive, unfortunately the ship was still unfinished due many specifications and was sent to upstate New York to finish the project and was later renamed USS Excelsior (NCC-2000).
 2285
 The events of Star Trek II: The Wrath of Khan.
 Kirk takes over command of the Enterprise from Captain Spock, who subsequently dies.
 The events of Star Trek III: The Search for Spock. The original USS Enterprise (NCC-1701), having been decommissioned by Starfleet, is destroyed to prevent it from falling into Klingon hands. Spock is revived.
 2286
 The events of Star Trek IV: The Voyage Home.  
 The USS Enterprise (NCC-1701-A) and is launched on its maiden voyage under the command of the newly demoted Capt. James Kirk.
 2287
 The events of Star Trek V: The Final Frontier. 
 2293
 The events of Star Trek VI: The Undiscovered Country. The USS Enterprise (NCC-1701-A) is decommissioned shortly afterwards.
 The opening events of Star Trek Generations. The USS Enterprise (NCC-1701-B) is launched under the command of John Harriman. While responding to a distress call, the Enterprise is struck by a discharge from the Nexus which breaches the hull and James T. Kirk is presumed killed in the blast. (The exact timing is uncertain and the events of Generations could take place in a later year.)

24th century
 2305
 Jean-Luc Picard is born in LaBarre, France on Earth.
 2311
 The Tomed Incident.
 2319
 Gary Seven is born.
 2324
 Beverly Howard (Crusher) is born in Copernicus City, Luna.
 2327
 Jean-Luc Picard graduates from Starfleet Academy on Earth (2323-2327). 
 2329
 Chakotay is born on a Federation colony near Cardassian space in the demilitarized zone
 2332
 Benjamin L. Sisko is born in New Orleans, Louisiana on Earth.
 2333
 Jean-Luc Picard becomes captain of the USS Stargazer.
 2335
 Geordi La Forge is born in Mogadishu, Somalia on Earth.
 William T. Riker is born in Valdez, Alaska on Earth.
 2336
Deanna Troi is born on Betazed.
 Kathryn Janeway is born in Bloomington, Indiana on Earth.
 2337
 Tasha Yar is born in a failed Federation colony on Turkana IV.
 2340
 Worf, son of Mogh, is born on the Klingon homeworld, Qo'noS.
 2341
 Julian Bashir is born.
 2343
 The Galaxy class development project is officially given the greenlight by Starfleet Command.
 2344
 The Enterprise-C, under the command of Captain Rachel Garrett, is destroyed defending a Klingon settlement on Narendra III under attack from Romulans.
 Due to the Enterprise-Cs sacrifice, a new era of more open communication begins between the Federation and the Klingon Empire, leading to a formalized alliance.
2345
Sela (half-romulan/half-human), daughter of Natasha Yar (alternate reality from "Yesterday's Enterprise"), is born.
 2346
 Worf's parents are killed by Romulans in the Khitomer massacre. Worf (age 6) is adopted by human parents.
 2349
 Annika Hansen is born in Tendara Colony, to Magnus and Erin Hansen.
 2355
 Magnus, Erin, and Annika Hansen are assimilated by the Borg while on a research mission in the Delta quadrant. 
 The USS Stargazer is attacked by an unknown vessel (later discovered to be Ferengi in origin) in the Maxia Zeta system. Jean-Luc Picard wins the confrontation by devising a tactic which becomes known as the Picard Manoeuvre. However, due to damage suffered during the battle, the crew are forced to abandon ship. The Stargazer is later recovered in 2364.
 2357
 Worf is the first Klingon to enter Starfleet Academy.
 USS Galaxy (NX-70637), the prototype Galaxy class is launched.
 2363
 USS Enterprise (NCC-1701-D), the third Galaxy-class starship (following the Galaxy and Yamato) is launched from the Utopia Planitia shipyards in Mars orbit (under the command of Jean-Luc Picard), and becomes the Federation's new flagship.
 2364–2370
 The events of Star Trek: The Next Generation.
 2367
 The Borg assimilate Captain Jean-Luc Picard; the Battle of Wolf 359 is fought 7.7 light years from Earth in Sector 001. The battle results in the loss of 39 Starfleet vessels and over 11,000 lives. Benjamin Sisko aboard the USS Saratoga is a participant in the battle and is one of the few survivors alongside his son Jake Sisko. With the task force lost, the Borg continue to Earth. Picard is rescued and the Borg cube is destroyed via the actions of the crew of the Enterprise-D.
 2369–2375
 The events of Star Trek: Deep Space Nine.
 2369
 Terok Nor, a Cardassian space station orbiting Bajor, is taken over by Starfleet following the end of hostilities between Bajor and Cardassia. It is redesignated Deep Space Nine and placed under the command of Commander (later Captain) Benjamin Sisko. Soon after, the discovery of a stable wormhole between the Alpha and Gamma quadrants leads to DS9 being relocated near the wormhole's location in order to facilitate trade, exploration and defense.
2370
 The events of Star Trek: Enterprise episode "These Are the Voyages..." take place. (this is due to the story being depicted as a holodeck recreation concurrent with the events of the TNG episode The Pegasus).
 The , a mothballed prototype originally designed to fight the Borg, is commissioned into active service and is assigned to Benjamin Sisko to help protect DS9. Due to the Defiant being over-powered and over-gunned for its size, several flaws in the ship's design require attention before it reaches a fully operational status. The Defiant is officially classed as an escort vessel; however, unofficially it is considered a warship built purely for combat. 
 2371
 The "present-day" events of Star Trek Generations. The USS Enterprise (NCC-1701-D)'s stardrive section is destroyed by a warp core breach; the saucer section containing the crew makes a forced landing on Veridian III. The ship is subsequently declared a total loss. James T. Kirk reappears from the temporal continuum in which he had been since his disappearance in 2293. Kirk is killed on Veridian III.
 2371–2378
 The events of Star Trek: Voyager.
 "Caretaker": the USS Voyager, under the command of Capt. Kathryn Janeway is stranded deep in the Delta Quadrant and faces a 75-year-long voyage back to Federation space. Janeway merges her crew with survivors of a vessel staffed by members of an organization called the Maquis that at this time are de facto enemies of the Federation.
 2372
 Sovereign-class USS Enterprise (NCC-1701-E) is launched under the command of Captain Jean-Luc Picard (with most of his command crew from the 1701-D intact).
 2373
 The events of Star Trek: First Contact. The Battle of Sector 001 occurs with a Starfleet Task Force engaging in a running battle with a Borg cube en route to Earth. The  from DS9 is severely damaged but not destroyed, with the crew evacuating to the Enterprise. The USS Enterprise (NCC-1701-E) follows a Borg sphere through a temporal rift and events shift at that point to 2063.
Still unaware that the USS Voyager is stuck in the Delta Quadrant, Starfleet officially declares the ship lost with all hands.
 2373–2375
 Tensions between the Alpha and Gamma quadrants erupt into open warfare, igniting the Dominion War fully, with DS9 at its epicenter.
 2374
 Using an abandoned sensor array network, the USS Voyager detects a Federation vessel, the USS Prometheus, on the edge of the Alpha Quadrant and transmits The Doctor to the ship. After freeing the ship from the Romulans with help from the Prometheus EMH, Voyager officially re-establishes contact with Starfleet.
 2375
 The  is destroyed. Several weeks later, DS9 receives a replacement Defiant Class vessel, the USS Sáo Paulo. Captain Sisko is granted special permission by Starfleet to rename the vessel Defiant.
After devastating losses on both sides, the Federation, alongside the Romulan and Klingon Empire, make a final push against the Dominion, resulting in the Battle of Cardassia. The Dominion subsequently surrenders to the Federation. 
 The events of Star Trek: Insurrection. Dialogue in this film and in the DS9 finale "What You Leave Behind" place the chronology of this film as during that episode, after the final battle of the war but before the treaty signing ceremony. Most notable in the film is Worf's ability to leave the station to join the Enterprise, as well as a line about Federation diplomats being involved in Dominion negotiations, and the Federation's willingness to work with the Son'a, who are established as a Dominion ally during the war.
 2378
 With the help of Admiral Janeway from an alternate timeline in which the ship's return is delayed many years with tragic results, the USS Voyager returns to the Alpha Quadrant. ("Endgame"). Tom Paris' and B'Elanna Torres's daughter is born. At some point after returning home (and prior to the events of Star Trek: Nemesis, Janeway is promoted to admiral in the main timeline.
 2379
 The events of Star Trek: Nemesis, resulting in the death of Lieutenant Commander Data.
 Discovery of previously unknown Android named "B-4", a prototype android similar in design to Lt. Commander Data but with a notably less advanced Positronic Network.
 2380-2381
 The events of Star Trek: Lower Decks. 
 2383
 The events of Star Trek: Prodigy.

2385, First Contact Day
 The events of Star Trek: Short Treks episode "Children of Mars" take place. The Utopia Planitia Fleetyards on Mars are sabotaged and subsequently destroyed by rogue synthetics in a surprise attack. The battle results in the loss of 92,143 lives, the planet itself being considered destroyed, its stratosphere ignited, and the destruction of the rescue armada to evacuate Romulus. In the aftermath of the attack, the Federation, unable to determine how or why the synths went rogue, bans the creation of synthetic lifeforms. 
2386
Lieutenant Icheb is captured and stripped for his Borg parts by Bjayzl, and subsequently euthanized by Seven of Nine.
2387
A star in the Romulan Empire goes Supernova. Ambassador Spock attempts to counter the resulting shockwave using Red Matter, but is unable to save the planet Romulus from destruction. Spock and the Romulan mining ship Narada, commanded by Nero, are dragged into a black hole created by the Red Matter detonation and arrive in the past. Nero's arrival in 2233 and subsequent attack on the USS Kelvin creates the Kelvin Timeline.
 2394
 Voyager returns to the Alpha Quadrant in the beginning of Star Trek: Voyager series finale ("Endgame"). This sets in motion events in which Kathryn Janeway becomes dissatisfied and begins laying plans to eventually change the timeline and send Voyager home sooner.
 2395
 The "Future" in the Star Trek: The Next Generation series finale ("All Good Things...").
 2399
 The events of Star Trek: Picard season 1.

25th century 
 2401
The events of Star Trek: Picard season 2 begin.
The events of Star Trek: Picard season 3 begin.
 2404 
 The original timeline split in the Star Trek: Voyager series finale (Endgame), where Admiral Janeway goes back 26 years to the Delta Quadrant and secures Voyagers earlier return to the Alpha Quadrant.  This begins a new timeline (as yet unnamed).

26th century
 c. 2540–2550
 The Starship Enterprise-J (presumably NCC 1701-J) is commissioned and takes part in the Battle of Procyon V against the Spherebuilders as shown in Enterprise episode "Azati Prime".

27th century
 Temporal Cold War (with agents from the 31st century); first established in the pilot episode of Star Trek: Enterprise and recurring until the series' fourth season premiere, it is a struggle between those who would alter history to suit their own ends and those who would preserve the integrity of the original timeline.
 With the distance between them having expanded over the centuries and making travel increasingly difficult, the last crossing between the Prime and Mirror Universes occurs at some point during this century.

29th century
 The Aeon-type timeship is in active service during this century ("Future's End"), as is the Wells-class timeship Relativity ("Relativity").

30th century
 Around the year 2958, supplies of Dilithium in the Milky Way started to dry up, marking the beginning of an energy crisis. The United Federation of Planets began development and trials of alternatives to warp drive, though none proved to be reliable.
 The Federation spends much of this century engaged in a temporal war with the objective of upholding the Temporal Accords to ensure the timeline remains unaltered.

31st century
 3069
A cataclysmic galaxy-wide event referred to as "The Burn" occurs. Nearly all dilithium in the galaxy suddenly went inert, causing a massive loss of life and the destruction of every ship and facility with an active warp core. In the aftermath, the remaining dilithium became an ever more scarce resource. With few ships and warp travel severely impeded, no explanation for what happened and the uncertainty if it will happen again, the United Federation of Planets effectively collapses.
3074
The main plot of the Star Trek: Voyager episode "Living Witness" takes place, and the final scene takes place "many years" after that.
 3089
The Federation & Starfleet Command depart Earth for a new headquarters location. Around the same time, the United Earth government withdraws Earth from the Federation, becoming fully self-sufficient and isolating itself from the rest of the galaxy.

 Episodes with time traveler Daniels from Enterprise
 "Cold Front", "Shockwave", "Azati Prime"

32nd century 
 3186
 This is the year Gabrielle Burnham arrived in after using the Red Angel suit to escape a Klingon attack on her home. (Discovery S2 E10)
3188-3190
 The events of Star Trek: Discovery seasons 3 to 4.

34th Century 
3374
 According to Obrist, if the Krenim weapon ship continued to alter time to this point, full restoration of the Krenim Imperium would not have been achieved.

Far future
 The events of Star Trek: Short Treks episode "Calypso" take place.

History of the chronology (historiography)
Several efforts have been made to develop a chronology for the events depicted by the Star Trek television series and its spin-offs. This matter has been complicated by the continued additions to the Star Trek canon, the existence of time travel and multiple concurrent timelines, and the scarcity of Gregorian calendar dates given in the show (stardates instead being used).

Original series
Not many references set the original series in an exact time frame, and those that exist are largely contradictory. In the episode "Tomorrow Is Yesterday", a 1960s military officer says that he's going to lock Captain Kirk up "for two hundred years", to which Kirk replies, with wry amusement: "That ought to be just about right." Likewise, in the episode "Space Seed", it is said that the 1996 warlord Khan Noonian Singh is from "two centuries" ago. Both these references place the show in the 22nd century. However, in the episode "Miri", it is said that 1960 was around 300 years ago, pushing the show into the 23rd century. Finally, the episode "The Squire of Gothos" implied that the light cone of 19th century Earth has expanded to 900 light years of radius, which seems to set the show in the 28th century, since light would take nine centuries to traverse that distance.

According to notes in The Making of Star Trek, the show is set in the 23rd century, and the Enterprise was supposed to be around 40 years old. Roddenberry says in this book that the stardate system was invented to avoid pinning down the show precisely in time frame. Roddenberry's original pitch for the series dated it "'somewhere in the future. It could be 1995, or maybe even 2995".

Early chronologies
The Star Trek Spaceflight Chronology and FASA, a publisher of the first licensed Star Trek role-playing game, chose to take the "Space Seed figure", adding a few years to make sure the events of the Original Series were in the 23rd century. This dating system is followed by other spin-off works in the 1980s, including Mr. Scott's Guide to the Enterprise. This timeline system gives the following dates

The sub-warp ship the UNSS Icarus makes first contact with Alpha Centauri in 2048, and there meets Zefrem Cochran [sic], who has invented warp drive.
The first Earth warp ship, the Bonaventure makes its first voyage, to Tau Ceti, in 2059.
The first contact with Vulcans is in 2065, when a damaged Vulcan spaceship is rescued by UNSS Amity.
The Federation is formed in 2087.
The Earth–Romulan War occurs in the 2100s.
First contact with the Klingon Empire in 2151, who demand the return of a group of refugees from the USS Sentry.
The first Constitution-class starship is launched in 2188.
The USS Enterprise's five-year mission under Captain Kirk lasts from 2207 to 2212. 
The events of Star Trek: The Motion Picture occur in 2217. 
The events of Star Trek II: The Wrath of Khan occur around 2222 (dialogue in the film says it is set "fifteen years" after the Season One episode "Space Seed").
The events of Star Trek IV: The Voyage Home occur on September 21, 2222. 

The Star Fleet Battles game was published in 1979, with a license only covering the original series. It has since diverged into an entirely separate fictional universe, new additions to which continue to be published. It does not tie into the Gregorian calendar, instead using a "Year 1" of the invention of Warp on Earth. Its version of the original series backstory is:

Y1 – Warp drive is developed on Earth.
Y4 – Federation is formed by Earth, Vulcan, Andoria, Alpha Centauri.
Y40-Y46 – Earth–Romulan War.
Y71 – Starfleet is formed.
Y126 – The Constitution-class is launched (an upgrade from the Republic-class).
Y154–159 – The events of the Original Series.

See Star Fleet Universe timeline.

TNG era and Okuda
Press materials for The Next Generation suggested it was set in the 24th century, seventy-eight years after the existing Star Trek, although the exact time frame had not yet been set in stone. The pilot had dialogue stating Data was part of the Starfleet "class of '78". The pilot episode, "Encounter at Farpoint", also has a cameo appearance by Leonard "Bones" McCoy, who is said to be 137.

In the last episode of the first season, the year is firmly established by Data as 2364. This marked the first time an explicit future calendar date had been attached to a Star Trek storyline, and allowed fans and writers to extrapolate further dates. For example, the established date implies McCoy was born around 2227, ruling out the Spaceflight Chronology-derived dating of the original series to the early 23rd century (though the dating had already been effectively overruled by Star Trek IV, which primarily takes place in 1986, where Kirk tells Gillian Taylor that he is from the late 23rd Century, though he does not give an exact date).

A Star Trek Chronology was published in 1993, written by production staff members Denise Okuda and Michael Okuda. A second edition was issued in 1996. Okuda originally drew up a timeline for internal use by writers, based on his own research and assumptions provided by Richard Arnold. The dates in the Chronology are consistent with the earlier Star Trek: The Next Generation Technical Manual.

It gives the following dates:

Zephram Cochrane invents warp drive around 2061 (so that the SS Valiant can be constructed and go missing two hundred years before "Where No Man Has Gone Before", dated to 2265; the first edition gives 2061; the second edition moves this to 2063 per Star Trek: First Contact).
 The Romulan War takes place in the 2150s (about a hundred years before "Balance of Terror").
 The Federation is formed in 2161, after the Romulan War, on the basis that "Balance of Terror" says that it was an Earth-Romulan war, not a Federation-Romulan War.
 The first Constitution-class starship is launched in 2244, followed by the Enterprise in 2245.
 Kirk's five-year mission lasts from 2264 to 2269, based on the assumption that the original series is set exactly 300 years after its original broadcast.
 Aired live-action Star Trek episodes are dated from 2266 to 2269. The chronology does not include the events of Star Trek: The Animated Series. This is in keeping also with Gene Roddenberry's concept (discussed in The Making of Star Trek by Roddenberry and Stephen Whitfield) that Star Trek's first season takes place after the mission has been under way for some time.
 An episode of Voyager, "Q2", aired after the Chronology was published, established that Kirk's five-year mission actually ended in 2270.
 The events of Star Trek: The Motion Picture take place in 2271 (Kirk has been Chief of Starfleet Operations for two and a half years, according to dialog from Kirk and Decker).
 The "Q2" dating for Kirk's five-year mission, moves the first film to c. 2273.
 Numerous sources, including the Chronology, postulate a second five-year mission under now-Admiral Kirk's command, begun soon after the events of the first movie; in part this is to take into account the unproduced revival series Star Trek: Phase II.
 The events of Star Trek II: The Wrath of Khan and Star Trek III: The Search for Spock take place in 2285.
The Wrath of Khan is a sequel to the episode "Space Seed", which Okuda dates to 2267. In Okuda's timeline there is a gap of eighteen years rather than the fifteen years established in dialog. The film was released in 1982, fifteen years after the episode's broadcast in 1967. The film begins on Kirk's birthday, which is semi-canonically established as March 22, the same as William Shatner's.
 The events of Star Trek IV: The Voyage Home take place in 2286.
This places Star Trek III in late 2285, as Kirk states in his log that the Enterprise crew has been on Vulcan for "three months" since bringing Spock home.
 The events of Star Trek V: The Final Frontier apparently take place soon after the events of the fourth film, as evidenced by Scotty's complaints about repairing the ship after its shakedown cruise, which was depicted at the end of Star Trek IV. Star Trek V would then take place in early 2287.
 The events of Star Trek VI: The Undiscovered Country take place in 2293, based on McCoy's statement that he had served on the Enterprise for 27 years, and his absence in "Where No Man Has Gone Before".
 The Kirk-era part of Star Trek Generations is set 78 years before 2371 (established by way of an on-screen caption), thus is set in 2293 and soon after Star Trek VI.

The gap between the 1986 film Star Trek IV: the Voyage Home (2286) and the 1987 first season of The Next Generation (2364) is 78 years by this timeline, matching early press materials.

A gap of 10 years passed between the broadcast of the last episode of Star Trek: The Original Series and the release of The Motion Picture. The film skirted around the fact the actors had aged, supposing that only two and a half years had passed since the events of the TV show. For Star Trek II, it was decided to acknowledge the reality of the aging actors, both by setting the film some 15 years after "Space Seed", and by having Kirk worry about getting old.

Within The Next Generation era, episodes and films are easier to date. Stardates correspond exactly with seasons, with the first two digits of the stardate representing the season number. Okuda assumes the start of a season is January 1 and the end of the season is December 31. The Next Generation, Deep Space Nine, and Voyager television series, as well as the movies, have roughly followed "real time", and are set around 377 years after their release.

Since the Chronology was published, it has been generally adhered-to by the producers of the show. The film Star Trek: First Contact and prequel series Star Trek: Enterprise both revisit the early era. In First Contact, Zephram Cochrane is confirmed as having invented warp drive on Earth, but the date is moved forward slightly to 2063, and it is revealed that Earth's official first contact with an alien species, the Vulcans, took place immediately afterwards as a result of this.

The dating of the final season of Star Trek: Voyager has presented controversy. The standard assumption about stardates, as well as the regular correspondence between seasons and in-universe years, would place the entire season in the year 2377; the season begins with stardate 54014.4 and ends with 54973.4. However, the episode "Homestead" features a celebration of the 315th anniversary of Zefram Cochrane's first contact with the Vulcans, which would set the episode on April 5, 2378. The fansite Memory Alpha thus places the final eight episodes of the season ("Human Error" through "Endgame") in 2378, with other sources following suit.

Enterprise is set in the 2150s, and ties into the Cochrane backstory. The show uses the Gregorian calendar instead of Stardates, making tracking the dating easier. Its pilot, "Broken Bow", depicts first contact with the Klingons occurring much earlier than the Okuda chronology anticipated (it suggested a date of 2218, based on a line in "Day of the Dove", noting that dialog in "First Contact" makes this problematic – though the actual line in the episode referred to hostilities between the two, and in Enterprise, Human-Klingon relations, while by no means friendly, clearly do not rise to the de facto state of war shown in TOS).  It shows the opening of the Romulan war and the start of a coalition between Earth, Vulcan, Andor, and Tellar in the 2150s. The date of the founding year of the Federation, 2161, was revealed in the fifth-season TNG episode "The Outcast," based on an early draft of the Okuda timeline. The final episode of Enterprise, "These Are the Voyages...", is consistent with the establishment of 2161 as the founding year for the Federation.

No version of the Chronology or the Encyclopedia has been published since 1999. A 2006 book by Jeff Ayers contains a timeline which attempts to date all of the many Star Trek novels. This timeline has The Motion Picture in 2273, to account for the two-and-a-half-year gap between the end-date of 2270 established in "Q2" and the events of the movie. The official website, StarTrek.com, still gives the date of that movie as 2271.

Eugenics Wars and World War III
When the original series of Star Trek was produced, the 1990s were several decades away, and so various elements of the backstory to Star Trek are set in that era, particularly the Eugenics Wars. The references to the Eugenics Wars and to a nuclear war in the 21st century are somewhat contradictory.

The episode "Space Seed" establishes the Eugenics Wars, and has them lasting from 1992 to 1996. The Eugenics Wars are described as a global conflict in which the progeny of a human genetic engineering project, most notably Khan Noonien Singh, established themselves as supermen and attempted world domination. Spock calls them "the last of your so-called World Wars", and McCoy identifies this with the Eugenics Wars.

In the episode "Bread and Circuses", Spock gives a death toll for World War III of 37 million. The episode "The Savage Curtain" features a Colonel Phillip Green, who led a genocidal war in the 21st century. The TNG episode "Encounter at Farpoint" further establishes a "post-atomic horror" on Earth in 2079.  However, the movie Star Trek: First Contact put the contact between Vulcans and humans at April 5, 2063.

The Star Trek Concordance identifies the "Bread and Circuses" figure as the death toll for a nuclear World War III, in the mid-21st century. Star Trek: First Contact firmly establishes World War III ended, after a nuclear exchange, in 2053, but with a body count of 600 million. The figure of Colonel Green is elaborated on in Star Trek: Enterprise. First Contact also deliberately describes the warring parties in World War III as "factions", not nations per se.

The Voyager episode "Future's End" saw the Voyager crew time-travel to Los Angeles in 1996, which, as the Encyclopedia notes, seems entirely unaffected by the Eugenics Wars, which ended that year. The episode acknowledges the issue only by featuring a model of Khan's DY-100-class ship on a 1996 desk. Khan's spaceship is another anomaly for the timeline, which has a variety of long-lost spaceships being launched between 1980 and 2100, with inconsistent levels of technology (caused by the increasing real lifetime and also decreased optimism about the pace of space exploration).

A reference in the Deep Space Nine episode "Doctor Bashir, I Presume?" suggests that the Eugenic Wars instead took place in the 22nd century. According to writer Ronald D. Moore, this was not an attempt at a retcon, but a mistake – when writing the episode, he recalled the already questionable "two centuries ago" line from "Space Seed" and forgot that DS9 takes place over 100 years later.

Season 4 of Star Trek: Enterprise involves a trilogy of episodes ("Borderland" "Cold Station 12", and "The Augments") related to scientist Doctor Arik Soong, ancestor of Doctor Noonien Soong, and his genetic augmentations of Humans. Numerous historical details of the devastating Eugenics Wars are discussed: the death of 35–37 million people; how Earth's governments could not decide on the fate of the 1,800 genetically enhanced embryos; and how Soong had infiltrated the complex and stolen and raised 19 embryos himself. Soong maintained that he himself and humanity in general had learned the lessons of the Eugenics Wars and should not continue to hide behind those events when there was progress to be made now that the technology had matured and was much more practicable. (The actions of his "children" convince him otherwise, and at the end of "The Augments" Soong declares his interest in cybernetics, beginning the work which would one day bring about Data.)

Greg Cox's two-book series The Eugenics Wars: The Rise and Fall of Khan Noonien Singh develops the idea of the Eugenics Wars in the context of real-life history by representing it as a secret history, and that the truth behind the various civil wars and conflicts in the 1990s was not generally known; Los Angeles, whose appearance in "Future's End" helped bring the war's existence into question, is portrayed as an EW "battlefront", the Rodney King riots being one such calamity.

The series Star Trek: Strange New Worlds, which first aired in spring 2022, complicates the time line further by retconning certain dating aspects by explicitly dating the Eugenics Wars to the first half of the 21st century, following a second American Civil War and leading up to the full-scale World War III nuclear conflict described in earlier films and episodes. This differs from "Space Seed" asserting that not only did the Eugenics Wars take place in the mid-1990s but dialogue indicates that they were either concurrent with or simply were World War III.

Cochrane
In the episode "Metamorphosis", it is stated that Zefram Cochrane of Alpha Centauri, the discoverer of the space warp, disappeared 150 years ago, at the age of 87. Based on the 2207 to 2212  originally given this would have put Cochrane's disappearance between 2057 to 2062 and his birth between 1970 to 1975.  However, Okuda's date of 2267 for that episode, puts Cochrane's disappearance in 2117 and birth in 2030. 1980s spin-off material such as the Star Trek Spaceflight Chronology posit that Cochrane was from Alpha Centauri originally, and that a sub-warp ship the UNSS Icarus arrived at Alpha Centauri in 2048 to find he had discovered the theory behind warp drive. The Icarus then relayed its findings back to Earth. The first prototype warp ship was launched in 2055.

The Star Trek Chronology does not hold with this theory, and asserts that Cochrane was an Earth native, who moved to Alpha Centauri later in life. (Even in "Metamorphosis", before Cochrane identifies himself to the landing party, Dr. McCoy had taken a tricorder scan and determined him to be human.) The first edition Chronology notes that Cochrane's invention of warp drive must have been at least 200 years before "Where No Man Has Gone Before", and suggests a date of 2061, noting that Cochrane would be 31 that year.

The film Star Trek: First Contact prominently features Cochrane's first successful warp flight. The film is set in 2063, two years after the Chronology suggestions, and therefore by the timeline Cochrane is 33. The actor who played Cochrane in that movie, James Cromwell, was 56 at the time of the film's release. The Encyclopedia notes the age issue, and claims that the Cromwell Cochrane had suffered from radiation poisoning, causing his aged appearance. Enterprise pins down Cochrane's disappearance to 2119, making Cochrane instead 31 at the time of First Contact.

See also
 Outline of Star Trek

Notes

 Except for the series finale – "These Are the Voyages..."
 The events of "These are the voyages..." are displayed as a holodeck simulation. Episode itself takes place in 2370 (stardate 47457.1)
 The film begins in the main timeline only to set up the alternate timeline.
 Stardate 47457.1, parallel with The Next Generation episode "Pegasus"

References

External links
 Memory Alpha, the Star Trek wiki: Category:Timeline

Star Trek
Star Trek